What-a-Mess is a series of children's books written by British comedy writer Frank Muir and illustrated by Joseph Wright. The title character is a dishevelled, accident-prone Afghan Hound puppy, whose real name is Prince Amir of Kinjan. The book series was later made into two animated series, both narrated by Muir.

Characters
 What-a-Mess – a scruffy Afghan puppy who is the main character of the franchise. His real name is Prince Amir of Kinjan. He has a yellow duck sitting on top of his head. In the US version, What-A-Mess is voiced by Ryan O'Donohue and he now has a collar in the US version.
 Baldwin: In the US animated version, the duck was coloured blue, as his character was merged with the bluebird in the UK animated version and books, and was also given the name Baldwin by What-A-Mess. 
 What-a-Mess's mom – also known as The Duchess of Kinjan is a pedigree Afghan Hound. She is voiced by Charity James in the US version.
 Family – the owners of What-a-Mess and his mother. They consist of the father, the mother, the son, and the daughter. Like most humans in the series, they are mostly seen from the neck down, with their faces slightly obscured. They are voiced by Michael Bell (as the father), Miriam Flynn (as the mother), Adam Hendershott (as the son), and Debi Derryberry (as the daughter), in the US version.
 Poppet – belonging to the father of the house's aunt, Poppet is a cute, clean, and yet troublemaking dog that What-a-Mess and his friends truly despise, making her first appearance in Super What-a-Mess.
 Archbishop of Canterbury – a scruffy dark blue dog with brown patches who What-A-Mess met and befriended in What-A-Mess Goes to the Seaside. He's named this way because when What-A-Mess introduces himself with his breed name he sarcastically replies "Wotcher, cock, I'm the Archbishop of Canterbury!", which the naive pup takes as his actual name. His name was changed to Norton in the US Animated Version, and he was voiced by Dana Hill.
 President of the United States – in one of the US version episodes where What-a-Mess got lost in town, he was helped by a dog voiced by Jim Cummings that had the same experience as the Archbishop of Canterbury in the UK version and books, where when What-a-Mess introduces himself with his breed name, he sarcastically replies "Oh really? And I'm the President of the United States!" which the naive pup takes as his actual name.
 The Cat Next Door – also known as Felicia in the US animated version, is a brown Siamese Cat that loves to tease What-A-Mess at times. In the US animated version, she was coloured blue and she was voiced by Jo Ann Harris.
 Cynthia – a hedgehog who What-A-Mess befriended in What-A-Mess Goes to School. Her character was redesigned to become a mole named Ramona (voiced by Candi Milo) in the US animated version because Hedgehogs aren't native to America.
 Ryvita – appearing only in the books, Ryvita is a ladybird that What-A-Mess and his friends befriended, and who first appeared in What-a-Mess Goes on Television. She speaks so small that only Cynthia could understand her.
 Esmeralda – a white mouse that belonged to the girl of the house, who only appeared in both the book, What-a-Mess and the Hairy Monster, and an episode of the US version of the same name. In the US version, she was voiced by Russi Taylor.
 Trash – only in the US animated version, Trash is a Bull Terrier who is a real troublemaker for What-A-Mess. His real name is Francis. He is voiced by Joe Nipote.
 Frank – an Old English Sheepdog that narrates the US animated version of What-A-Mess, voiced by Frank Muir.

Books list

Large Books
 What-a-Mess
 What-a-Mess The Good
 What-a-Mess at the Seaside
 What-a-Mess Goes to School
 Prince What-a-Mess
 Super What-a-Mess
 What-a-Mess and the Cat Next Door
 What-a-Mess Goes on Television
 What-a-Mess and the Hairy Monster

Small Books
Four Seasons
 What-a-Mess in Spring
 What-a-Mess in Summer
 What-a-Mess in Autumn
 What-a-Mess in Winter

Four Square Meals
 What-a-Mess has Breakfast
 What-a-Mess has Lunch
 What-a-Mess has Tea
 What-a-Mess has Supper

Mini Books
 What-a-Mess has a Brain Wave
 What-a-Mess and Little Poppet
 What-a-Mess and a trip to the Vet
 What-a-Mess the Beautiful
 What-a-Mess Goes to Town
 What-a-Mess Goes Camping

Animated series
An animated series was made in the UK in 1979 by Smallfilms. More episodes were made in the UK in 1990 by Central Independent Television, Link Licensing, and Bevanfield Films. A second, American version was made in 1995 by DIC Productions L.P. and aired on ABC in the United States. It aired on YTV from 1995 to 1999 in Canada, and aired on Spacetoon from 2004 to 2014 in the Arab world. Both versions were narrated by Muir. Both animated series aired on the Australian Broadcasting Corporation in Australia.

Episodes

Version 1 (Smallfilms, iTV / UK series)

Version 2 (DIC Productions, L.P. / US series)

Home releases

UK series
 What-A-Mess: 5 Hilarious Adventures – "What-a-Mess Goes to the Seaside", "What-a-Mess Goes to School", "Prince What-a-Mess", "Super What-a-Mess", "What-a-Mess Keeps Cool" (Extra Episodes – "What-a-Mess and Cynthia the Hedgehog", "What-a-Mess Has a Brain Wave!")
 What-A-Mess: Small VHS Sample – "What-a-Mess and Cynthia the Hedgehog", "What-a-Mess Has a Brain Wave!", "What-a-Mess and the Cat Next Door"
 What-A-Mess: Cat & Seaside (DVD) – Consisting of the entire UK series.

US series
In October 1996, Buena Vista Home Video under the DIC Toon-Time Video imprint released two VHS tapes called Monsters, Goblins, and Ghosts, Oh my! and Here Comes Santa Paws. The former contained the segments "What-A-Mess and the Hairy Monster", "Trick Or Treat", and "My Tea Time with Frank". The latter contained the Santa What-a-Mess special.

On 13 November 2003, Sterling Entertainment released a VHS/DVD called Christmas Mess, containing the Santa What-a-Mess special as well as the segments "Trash's Wonderful Life", "The Thanksgiving Turkey", Snowbound", "All Around the Mallberry Bush", "It's Raining Cats and Dogs" and "At the Movies", with the DVD version containing the segments "His Majesty, Prince What-a-Mess", "Ultimate What-a-Mess" and "This Hydrant is Mine" as bonus episodes. The DVD was re-issued by NCircle Entertainment in 2007.

References

External links

 1979: 
 1995: 

British picture books
Books about dogs
American television shows based on children's books
British television shows based on children's books
Animated television series about dogs
British children's animated comedy television series
BBC children's television shows
ITV children's television shows
American Broadcasting Company original programming
Television series by DIC Entertainment
Television series by DHX Media
1979 British television series debuts
1980 British television series endings
1990 British television series debuts
1990 British television series endings
1970s British animated television series
1980s British animated television series
1990s British animated television series
1970s British children's television series
1980s British children's television series
1990s British children's television series
1995 American television series debuts
1996 American television series endings
1990s American animated television series
1990s American children's comedy television series
Television series by ITV Studios
English-language television shows
American children's animated comedy television series